Macrosemia is a genus of Asian cicadas in the tribe Dundubiini.  Species records are from Taiwan and the eastern Asian mainland, including Indo-China.

Species
The Global Biodiversity Information Facility lists:
 Macrosemia anhweiensis Ouchi, 1938
 Macrosemia assamensis (Distant, 1905)
 Macrosemia beaudouini (Boulard, 2003)
 Macrosemia diana (Distant, 1905)
 Macrosemia divergens (Distant, 1917)
 Macrosemia hopponis (Kato, 1925) - type species (as Platylomia hopponis Kato, 1925)
 Macrosemia juno (Distant, 1905)
 Macrosemia kareisana (Matsumura, 1907)
 Macrosemia khuanae Boulard, 2001
 Macrosemia kiangsuensis Kato, 1938
 Macrosemia lamdongensis Pham, Bui & Constant, 2016
 Macrosemia matsumurai (Kato, 1928)
 Macrosemia perakana (Moulton & J.C., 1923)
 Macrosemia pieli (Kato, 1938)
 Macrosemia saturata (F.Walker, 1858)
 Macrosemia suavicolor Boulard, 2008
 Macrosemia sulaiyai (Boulard, 2005)
 Macrosemia tonkiniana (Jacobi, 1905)
 Macrosemia umbrata (Distant, 1888)
 synonyms: Cosmopsaltria umbrata Distant, 1888; Macrosemia chantrainei Boulard, 2003; Platylomia umbrata Moulton & J.C., 1912

References

External links 

Photos on Cicada Mania

Dundubiini
Hemiptera of Asia
Hemiptera genera